Women in Fiji live in or are from the Republic of Fiji. On March 8, 2007, The Fiji Times ONLINE described Fijian women as playing an important role in the fields of economic and social development in Fijian society. The women of the Republic of Fiji are the "driving force" in health service as nurses and medical doctors. They are also key players and managers in the tourism and entertainment industries, as well as teachers in the field of education.

According to the article Women's work and fertility in Fiji, "the presence of very young children and larger family sizes contribute to the low level of labour force participation of Fijian and Indian women in Fiji." By culture and tradition, a woman in Fiji lives in a paternalistic and patriarchal society wherein she has a secondary role at home performing household chores that include cooking meals and  cleaning the house. As community and village members women are treated as subservient to men.

Eating customs
By tradition, most of the cooking is performed by Fijian women. Indo-Fijian cuisine may include food made from starch and involves the use of relishes made from vegetables. If available, meat and fish are also eaten. Flatbread may be made from locally grown rice or from imported flour. Traditional Indo-Fijian eating custom requires that women eat separately from men. For religious reasons Hindu Indo-Fijians avoid consuming beef and Muslim Indo-Fijians avoid consuming pork.

Violence against women 

Violence against women in Fiji is recognised to be "pervasive, widespread and a serious national issue" in the Pacific Island region. Fiji's rates of violence against women are "among the very highest in the world". The Fiji Women's Crisis Centre reports that 64% of women who have been in intimate relationships have experienced physical or sexual violence from their partner, including 61% who were physically attacked and 34% who were sexually abused.

The 2006 Fijian coup d'état created conditions which exacerbated the presence of violence against women in Fijian society, especially in the public sector. Conventional attitudes about the place of women in Fijian society perpetuate the normalisation of violence against women and permeate extended family groups, the local authorities and the judiciary.  Customary and religious practices like bulubulu (forgiveness ceremonies) deal with domestic violence cases within the family, usually either precluding prosecution for the perpetrator or reducing their sentence.

See also 
Fiji Women's Crisis Centre

References

External links 

 Ministry of Women, Social Welfare & Housing
 Fijian women, Fiji - Fijian women in street, Lonely Planet
 National Council of Women Fiji
 Fiji Women's Rights Movement
 Fiji Women's Crisis Centre
 Chan, Iris. The different roles of men and women in a Fijian village, Oceania Cultural Internships Program, Australian National University, 13 December 2010
 CULTURAL AND TRADITIONAL PRACTICES, AND WOMEN'S STATUS IN THE PACIFIC, WOMEN, DEVELOPMENT AND EMPOWERMENT: A PACIFIC FEMINIST PERSPECTIVE, Victoria University of Wellington

 
Melanesian people